Mondaq Ltd. is a content aggregator service in the legal industry with headquarters in New York, launched in 1994, that operates worldwide, providing free expert financial, and regulatory, and legal information on topics such as employment, tax, litigation, healthcare, government, and real estate through online publications.

Background
Mondaq is a content aggregator that organizes and publishes curated content from professional advisers, such as law firms and financial institutions. Mondaq operates worldwide, and by 2017, included "legal insights from over 70 countries." Mondaq provides free expert information on topics such as employment, tax, litigation, healthcare, government, and real estate. By 2008, Mondaq was one of three main services in the aggregation market, along with Lexology, and Linex Legal—"mining" law firm publications for expert information and republishing the results. These three had the "broadest coverage" at that time. By 2017, Mondaq was still recommended along with Lexology and JD Supra among the top three aggregator services for expert content.

References

2007 establishments in New York City
Business services companies of the United States